Ranua is a municipality of Finland. It is located in the province of Lapland.

The municipality is unilingually Finnish.

Geography 
Neighbouring municipalities are Ii, Simo, Tervola, Rovaniemi, Posio and Pudasjärvi.

Villages 
Villages within the municipality of Ranua are inclusive of:

 Asmunti
 Hosio
 Impiö
 Kelankylä
 Kortteenperä
 Kuha
 Kuukasjärvi
 Mauru
 Nuupas
 Petäjäjärvi
 Pohjaslahti–Piittisjärvi
 Portimo
 Putkivaara
 Raiskio
 Rovastinaho
 Saariharju
 Saukkojärvi
 Sääskilahti
 Teerivaara
 Telkkälä
 Tolja

Nature of Ranua
There are 569 lakes in Ranua. The biggest of them are lake Ranuanjärvi and lake Simojärvi. There are also quite many rapids and natural salmon living in the rapids.

History 

Ranua was originally the name of a farm established in the 18th century. It gets its name from the lake Ranuanjärvi, which was first mentioned in 1553. Its name is likely of Tavastian origin, as ranu- toponyms are rare and mainly found in Tavastia.

The parish of Ranua was formed from parts of Simo, Pudasjärvi and Rovaniemen maalaiskunta in 1899. The area became a separate municipality in 1917. A part of it was given to the newly formed Posio municipality in 1926. It is the only municipality in Lapland where the dialect is a Northern Ostrobothnian one, albeit with some influence from the Kainuu dialects, which are a subset of Savonian dialects.

Tourism
Perhaps the most well known attraction is the Ranua Zoo, the northernmost zoo in the world, which has many arctic animals, including the polar bear, which is the mascot of the zoo. Ranua Zoo is the only place where you can see a living polar bear in Finland.

Other notable attractions within the municipality of Ranua are inclusive of the Saukkojärvi Local History and School Museum located in the village of Saukkojärvi, Finland, the Hillamarkkinat, Poro Island and the Church of Ranua.

Sister cities 
 Iwasaki, Japan (since 1990)

Notable people
 Eero Lohi (born 1927), modern pentathlete
 Lauri Impiö (1929–2006), Lutheran clergyman and politician
 Jouko Kuha (born 1939), long-distance runner
 Taina Impiö (born 1956), cross country skier
 Ilkka Koivula (born 1966), actor
 Kaisa H. Hietala (born 1971), business executive
 Jenna Pirttijärvi (born 1994), ice hockey player

References

External links

 Municipality of Ranua – Official website

 
Populated places established in 1917